The 1982–83 FDGB-Pokal was the 32nd competition for the trophy. By beating FC Karl-Marx-Stadt, 1. FC Magdeburg won their 7th FDGB-Pokal title.

Participants 

89 teams were eligible for the 1982-83 FDGB-Pokal. The 14 DDR-Oberliga teams and the 60 DDR-Liga teams were joined by the winners of the 15 1981-82 Bezirkspokal competitions.

Mode 

The Oberliga teams of the 1982-83 season joined the competition in the second round. The other had to play through a qualifying round, followed by the first round proper and an intermediate round. All fixtures were decided in a single match, in case of a draw extra time was played, followed by a penalty shootout, if the score was still level.

Competition

Qualifying round

First round 

* denotes Bezirkspokal winners(1) Match awarded to BSG Aktivist Schwarze Pumpe, as Robur Zittau had neglected to bring their players' passes.

Intermediate round

Second round

Third round

Quarterfinals

Semifinals

Final

Statistics

Match report 
Magdeburg and Karl-Marx-Stadt met after a disappointing season, finishing 6th and 9th in the league respectively, leading to some calling this final unattractive and unpopular. In the event, Magdeburg performed on par with their league play as well as Karl-Marx-Stadt, but Magdeburg's players were able to frustrate their opposition's desire to always have Magdeburg's players covered, leading to a number of yellow cards and several free-kicks, one of which led to Wittke's goal to make it 2-0 to Magdeburg. Just three minutes earlier, Streich had scored of a Steinbach pass, turning past defender Uhlig and finishing of for his first goal ever in a cup final. Especially Karl-Marx-Stadt's defense had enormous problems to cope with Magdeburg's attacking play, whereas Magdeburg defenders Raugust, Mewes and Schößler along with their sweeper Stahmann had little to nothing to do. Stahmann even found the time to set up Streich's second goal with a 40-meter-pass. The fourth goal only helped to mark the superiority of Magdeburg's team on this day, after Halata and Cebulla had already wasted several opportunities. In the end, Magdeburg won a final that they had easily dominated, winning their 7th FDGB-Pokal title.

References 

1982-83
East
Cup